The Astana (Malay: Astana Sarawak) is a palace in Kuching, Sarawak, Malaysia, on the north bank of the Sarawak River, opposite the Kuching Waterfront. It is the official residence of the Yang di-Pertua Negeri Sarawak, the governor of Sarawak. The name is a variation of 'istana', meaning 'palace'. It was built in 1870 by the second White Rajah, Charles Brooke, as a wedding gift to his wife, Margaret Alice Lili de Windt. The palace is not normally open to the public, although the landscaped gardens are, which can be reached by a boat ride across the Sarawak River. It is part of the Kuching Heritage Trail.

History 
The Astana, then called Government House, was built in 1870 by the second White Rajah, Charles Brooke, as a wedding gift to his wife, Margaret Alice Lili de Windt. The couple married at Highworth, Wiltshire on 28 October 1869 and she was raised to the title of Ranee of Sarawak with the style of Her Highness upon their marriage. Ranee Margaret arrived in Sarawak in 1870, and the royal couple then occupied The Astana as their main home. She later reminisced about life in The Astana and colonial Borneo in her memoir My Life in Sarawak, which was published in 1913. Brooke is said to have cultivated betel nut in a small plantation behind the Astana, so that he could offer fresh betel nut to visiting Dayak chiefs.

Architecture 
The residence was originally three separate buildings, with each connected to the other by short and narrow passageways. The Astana has since undergone major renovations and alterations befitting it as the official residence of the governor of Sarawak.

See also 
 New Sarawak State Legislative Assembly Building
 Wisma Bapa Malaysia

References

External links 

Tourist attractions in Kuching
Buildings and structures in Kuching
Palaces in Malaysia
Official residences of Malaysian state leaders
1870 establishments in Sarawak
19th-century architecture in Malaysia